Richard Ewart (15 September 1904 – 8 March 1953) was a Labour Party politician in England.  He was elected at the 1945 general election as Member of Parliament (MP) for  Sunderland. When that 2-seat constituency was divided for the 1950 general election, he was returned for the new Sunderland South constituency, which re-elected him in  1951.  He died in office in 1953, aged 48.

References

External links 
 

1904 births
1953 deaths
GMB (trade union)-sponsored MPs
Labour Party (UK) MPs for English constituencies
UK MPs 1945–1950
UK MPs 1950–1951
UK MPs 1951–1955